Mark Jay Levine (October 4, 1938 – January 27, 2022) was an American jazz pianist, trombonist, composer, author and educator.

Early life
Levine was born in Concord, New Hampshire, on October 4, 1938. He began playing the piano at the age of five and started trombone in his early teens. He attended Boston University, and graduated with a degree in music in 1960. He also studied privately with Jaki Byard, Hall Overton, and Herb Pomeroy.

Career
After graduating, Levine moved to New York, where he freelanced and then played with musicians including Houston Person (1966), Mongo Santamaría (1969–70), and Willie Bobo (1971–74). Levine then moved to San Francisco, and played there with Woody Shaw in 1975–76. Levine made his first recording as a leader for Catalyst Records in 1976. He also played with the Blue Mitchell/Harold Land Quintet (1975–79), Joe Henderson, Stan Getz, Bobby Hutcherson, Luis Gasca, and Cal Tjader (1979–83). From 1980 to 1983, he concentrated on valve trombone, but then returned to playing mainly the piano. He then led his own bands, and recorded for Concord as a leader in 1983 and 1985. From 1992 Levine was part of Henderson's big band. Levine created a new trio in 1996 and recorded it for his own, eponymous label. His Latin jazz group, Que Calor, was formed in 1997.

Levine began teaching in 1970: in addition to private lessons, he worked at Diablo Valley College (1979–95), Mills College (1985–95), Antioch University in San Francisco (1986–87), the San Francisco Conservatory of Music (1992–97), Sonoma State University (1989-1990), and the JazzSchool in Berkeley (from 1997). Levine also wrote two method books: The Jazz Piano Book (1990), and The Jazz Theory Book (around 1995). He was nominated for a Grammy Award for Best Latin Jazz Album in 2003 for his recording Isla.

Personal life and death
Levine died of pneumonia on January 27, 2022, at the age of 83.

Discography

As leader

As sideman
With Pete & Sheila Escovedo
 Solo Two (Milestone Records, 1977)
With Cal Tjader
 La Onda Va Bien (Concord, 1979)
 Gozame! Pero Ya... (Concord, 1980)
 A Fuego Vivo (Concord, 1981)
 Heat Wave (Concord, 1982) - with Carmen McRae
 Good Vibes (Concord, 1984)
With Houston Person
 Underground Soul! (Prestige, 1966)
With Joe McPhee
 Rotation (HatHUT, 1977)
With Moacir Santos
 Saudade (Blue Note, 1974)

Bibliography
 The Jazz Piano Book, Sher Music Co. (1989), ISBN 0961470151
 The Jazz Theory Book, Sher Music Co. (1995), ISBN 1883217040
 Jazz Piano Masterclass with Mark Levine. The Drop 2 Book, Sher Music Co. (2006), ISBN 1-883217-47-4
 How to Voice Standards at the Piano: The Menu, Sher Music Co. (2014), ISBN 1883217806

References

1938 births
2022 deaths
20th-century American male musicians
20th-century American pianists
21st-century American male musicians
21st-century American pianists
American jazz educators
American music educators
American jazz pianists
American male pianists
American male jazz musicians
Afro Blue Band members
People from Concord, New Hampshire
Musicians from New Hampshire